Telenomus is a genus of parasitoid wasps from the subfamily Telenominae. The genus was first described by Alexander Henry Haliday in 1833. Species in this genus  parasitise the eggs or immature stages of other insects. 

Known hosts include : Agrius convolvuli, Amsacta moorei, Bagrada hilaris, Chilo auricilius, Cricula trifenestrata, Eudocima fullonia, Helicoverpa armigera, Helicoverpa punctigera, Helopeltis antonii, Helopeltis theivora, Leptocybe invasa, Orgyia postica, Piezodorus hybneri, and Sahlbergella singularis.

Species
This list is incomplete: See List of Telenomus species.
 Telenomus alsophilae  Viereck, 1924 	 
 Telenomus arzamae  Riley, 1893 	 
 Telenomus bakeri  Kieffer, 1906 	 
 Telenomus bifidus Riley, 1887 	 
 Telenomus brachialis Haliday, 1833
 Telenomus californicus Ashmead, 1893
 Telenomus catalpae Muesebeck, 1935
 Telenomus chrysopae Ashmead, 1898
 Telenomus clisiocampae Riley, 1893
 Telenomus coelodasidis Ashmead, 1893
 Telenomus coloradensis Crawford, 1910
 Telenomus dalmani  (Ratzeburg, 1844)
 Telenomus dimmocki Ashmead, 1898
 Telenomus dolichocerus  (Ashmead, 1887)
 Telenomus emersoni  (Girault, 1916)
 Telenomus fimbriatus Kieffer, 1904
 Telenomus flavipes  (Ashmead, 1893)
 Telenomus floridanus  (Ashmead, 1893)
 Telenomus geometrae Ashmead, 1893
 Telenomus gnophaelae Ashmead, 1893
 Telenomus goniopsis Crawford, 1913
 Telenomus gossypiicola Ashmead, 1893
 Telenomus gracilicornis Ashmead, 1893
 Telenomus graptae Howard, 1889
 Telenomus heliothidis Ashmead, 1893
 Telenomus heracleicola Brues, 1906
 Telenomus hubbardi Ashmead, 1893
 Telenomus hullensis Harrington, 1899
 Telenomus ichthyurae Ashmead, 1893
 Telenomus infuscatipes  (Ashmead, 1893)
 Telenomus koebelei Ashmead, 1893
 Telenomus lavernae Ashmead, 1893
 Telenomus longicornis Ashmead, 1901
 Telenomus maculipennis Ashmead, 1893
 Telenomus minimus Ashmead, 1893
 Telenomus nigriscapsus Ashmead, 1893
 Telenomus noctuae Ashmead, 1893
 Telenomus opacus  (Howard, 1889)
 Telenomus ovivorus  (Ashmead, 1893)
 Telenomus pamphilae Ashmead, 1899
 Telenomus pentatomus Kieffer, 1906 
 Telenomus perplexus Girault, 1906
 Telenomus persimilis Ashmead, 1893
 Telenomus podisi Ashmead, 1893
 Telenomus pusillus Ashmead, 1893
 Telenomus quaintancei Girault, 1906
 Telenomus remus Nixon, 1937
 Telenomus reynoldsi Gordh and Coker, 1973
 Telenomus rileyi Howard, 1889
 Telenomus sphingis  (Ashmead, 1887)
 Telenomus spilosomatis Ashmead, 1893
 Telenomus szelenyii Muesebeck, 1974
 Telenomus tabanivorus (Ashmead, 1895)
 Telenomus tetratomus Kieffer, 1906
 Telenomus texanus Brues, 1902

References 

Hymenoptera genera
Platygastridae
Taxa named by Alexander Henry Haliday
Taxa described in 1833